A lens flare happens when light is scattered or flared in a lens system, often in response to a bright light, producing a sometimes undesirable artifact in the image. This happens through light scattered by the imaging mechanism itself, for example through internal reflection and forward scatter from material imperfections in the lens. Lenses with large numbers of elements such as zooms tend to have more lens flare, as they contain a relatively large number of interfaces at which internal scattering may occur. These mechanisms differ from the focused image generation mechanism, which depends on rays from the refraction of light from the subject itself.

There are two types of flare: visible artifacts and glare across the image. The glare makes the image look "washed out" by reducing contrast and color saturation (adding light to dark image regions, and adding white to saturated regions, reducing their saturation). Visible artifacts, usually in the shape of the aperture made by the iris diaphragm, are formed when light follows a pathway through the lens that contains one or more reflections from the lens surfaces.

Flare is particularly caused by very bright light sources. Most commonly, this occurs when aiming toward the Sun (when the Sun is in frame or the lens is pointed sunward), and is reduced by using a lens hood or other shade. For good-quality optical systems, and for most images (which do not have a bright light shining into the lens), flare is a secondary effect that is widely distributed across the image and thus not visible, although it does reduce contrast.

Manifestation 

The spatial distribution of the lens flare typically manifests as several starbursts, rings, or circles in a row across the image or view. Lens flare patterns typically spread widely across the scene and change location with the camera's movement relative to light sources, tracking with the light position and fading as the camera points away from the bright light until it causes no flare at all. The specific spatial distribution of the flare depends on the shape of the aperture of the image formation elements. For example, if the lens has a 6-bladed aperture, the flare may have a hexagonal pattern.

Such internal scattering is also present in the human eye, and manifests in an unwanted veiling glare most obvious when viewing very bright lights or highly reflective surfaces. In some situations, eyelashes can also create flare-like irregularities, although these are technically diffraction artifacts.

When a bright light source is shining on the lens but not in its field of view, lens flare appears as a haze that washes out the image and reduces contrast. This can be avoided by shading the lens using a lens hood. In a studio, a gobo or set of barn doors can be attached to the lighting to keep it from shining on the camera. Filters can be attached to the camera lens which will also minimise lens flare, which is especially useful for outdoor photographers.

When using an anamorphic lens, as is common in analog cinematography, lens flare can manifest itself as horizontal lines. This is most commonly seen in car headlights in a dark scene, and may be desired as part of the "film look".

Deliberate use 

A lens flare is often deliberately used to invoke a sense of drama. A lens flare is also useful when added to an artificial or modified image composition because it adds a sense of realism, implying that the image is an un-edited original photograph of a "real life" scene.

For both of these reasons (implying realism and/or drama) artificial lens flare is a common effect in various graphics editing programs, although its use can be a point of contention among professional graphic designers. Lens flare was one of the first special effects developed for computer graphics because it can be imitated using relatively simple means. Basic flare-like effects, for instance in computer and video games, can be obtained using static or animated starburst, ring, and disc textures that are moved according to the position of the light source. More sophisticated rendering techniques have been developed based on ray tracing or photon mapping.

Lens flare was typically avoided by Hollywood cinematographers, but when filming Easy Rider (1969), Harrison Arnold was forced to modify a camera car for his Arriflex, which resulted in numerous lens flares as he shot motorcycle footage against landscapes of the Southwestern United States.

Director J. J. Abrams added numerous lens flares to his films Star Trek (2009) and Super 8 (2011) by aiming powerful off-camera light sources at the lens. He explained in an interview about Star Trek: "I wanted a visual system that felt unique. I know there are certain shots where even I watch and think, 'Oh that's ridiculous, that was too many.' But I love the idea that the future was so bright it couldn't be contained in the frame." Many complained of the frequent use; Abrams admitted it was "overdone, in some places."

David Boyd, the director of photography of the sci-fi Firefly series, desired this style so much (harkening back to 1970s television), that he sent back cutting-edge lenses that reduced lens flare in exchange for cheaper ones.

The first deliberate lens flare was made by cinematographer Hiroshi Segawa in the movie Woman in the Dunes in 1964. Earlier in the movies, lens flare was considered as defect and was strongly avoided.

Director Michael Bay, well known for heavy use of CGI in his films, digitally adds lens flares to most light sources in his films.

Other forms of photographic flare

Filter flare 
The use of photographic filters can cause flare, particularly ghosts of bright lights (under central inversion). This can be eliminated by not using a filter, and reduced by using higher-quality filters or narrower aperture.

Diffraction artifact in digital cameras 
One form of flare is specific to digital cameras. With the sun shining on an unprotected lens, a group of small rainbows appears. This artifact is formed by internal diffraction on the image sensor, which acts like a diffraction grating. Unlike true lens flare, this artifact is not visible in the eyepiece of a digital SLR camera, making it more difficult to avoid.

Gallery

See also 
 Anti-reflective coating, used to reduce lens flare and produces the red and green colors common in lens flare.
 Bokeh, a source of circles around out-of-focus bright points, also due in part to the internals of the lens.
 Diffraction spike, a type of lens flare seen in some telescopes

References 

Science of photography
Lenses
Optical phenomena